St. Marguerite Bourgeoys Parish is a Roman Catholic church in Brookfield, Connecticut, part of the  Diocese of Bridgeport.

History
St. Marguerite Bourgeoys Parish was founded in 1982. The present St. Marguerite Bourgeoys Church was designed in the late 1980s by Kosinsky Association.

References

External links 
 St. Marguerite Bourgeoys Parish Website
 Diocese of Bridgeport
 St. Marguerite Bourgeoys Parish Facebook Page

Roman Catholic churches in Connecticut
Christian organizations established in 1982
Roman Catholic churches completed in 1986
Buildings and structures in Brookfield, Connecticut
Churches in Fairfield County, Connecticut
1982 establishments in Connecticut
20th-century Roman Catholic church buildings in the United States